Samuel Austin may refer to:

Samuel Austin (artist) (died 1834), English painter
Samuel Austin the elder, English religious poet
Samuel Austin the younger (died c. 1665), poetical writer
Samuel Austin (soldier) (1829–1903), recipient of the New Zealand Cross
Sam Austin (born 1996), English footballer

See also